The 1994 Borders Regional Council election, the sixth and final election to Borders Regional Council, was held on 5 May 1994 as part of the wider 1994 Scottish regional elections. All 27 seats were up for election, an increase of 4 from the last election due to boundary changes. 5 electoral divisions were uncontested, and a total of 64 candidates stood for election. The election saw Independents take the most seats, although they lost their overall majority.

Aggregate Results

Ward Results

References

1994 Scottish local elections
May 1994 events in the United Kingdom